Bruno Duarte da Silva (born 24 March 1996), known as Bruno Duarte or simply Bruno, is a Brazilian footballer who plays as a forward for Saudi Professional League club Damac.

Club career

Portuguesa
Born in São Paulo, São Paulo, Bruno Duarte started out at local São Paulo FC. In March 2016, after a stint at Palmeiras, he joined Portuguesa and was assigned to the under-20 squad.

Bruno Duarte made his senior debut on 4 June 2016, starting in a 3–1 Série C home win against Ypiranga-RS. He featured in six matches during the campaign, as his side suffered relegation.

Bruno Duarte scored his first senior goal on 9 April 2017, netting the opener in a 1–1 away draw against Guarani for the Campeonato Paulista Série A2. The following March, he asked to leave the club.

Lviv
In July 2018, Bruno Duarte signed a three-year contract with FC Lviv in the Ukrainian Premier League. He made his debut abroad on 22 July, in the away game of the first round against FC Arsenal Kyiv. On 22 September, he equalised in a 1–1 home draw with FC Karpaty Lviv in the West Ukrainian football derby.

Vitória Guimarães
On 15 August 2019, Bruno Duarte signed a four-year deal with the option of a fifth at Vitória S.C. in the Portuguese Primeira Liga. The transfer fee was €600,000 for 75% of his economic rights. He made his debut a week later, starting in a goalless draw away to FCSB in the UEFA Europa League play-offs. On 22 September, he scored his first goal in a 3–1 win at C.D. Tondela, and also netted in both Europa group games against Arsenal, including a late equaliser on 6 November at the Estádio D. Afonso Henriques.

In 2020–21, Bruno Duarte was more often a substitute behind Colombian Óscar Estupiñán, while new manager Pepa experimented with them in tandem the following season. In the Taça da Liga, he scored in three games as Vitória reached the semi-finals at the expense of S.L. Benfica; this included a late equaliser at home to that team on 27 October.

Damac
On 22 July 2022, Bruno Duarte joined Saudi Arabian club Damac. The transfer fee was reported to be worth an initial €600,000, which could rise to €700,000 with add-ons.

References

External links
 Player's statistics. Football Federation of Ukraine
 Footballer's profile. Ukrainian Premier League
 
 
 
 

1996 births
Living people
Footballers from São Paulo
Brazilian footballers
Association football forwards
Campeonato Brasileiro Série C players
Campeonato Brasileiro Série D players
Associação Portuguesa de Desportos players
Ukrainian Premier League players
FC Lviv players
Brazilian expatriate footballers
Brazilian expatriate sportspeople in Ukraine
Expatriate footballers in Ukraine
Primeira Liga players
Vitória S.C. players
Expatriate footballers in Portugal
Brazilian expatriate sportspeople in Portugal
Saudi Professional League players
Damac FC players
Expatriate footballers in Saudi Arabia
Brazilian expatriate sportspeople in Saudi Arabia